AMR GP, officially AMR GP Limited (formerly Racing Point UK Limited) is a British company that owns and operates the Aston Martin F1 Team, a Formula One racing team based in Silverstone, England. The company was established in August 2018 to buy the Formula One racing assets of the financially stricken Force India Formula One Team. Following its acquisition of the team assets just before the 2018 Belgian Grand Prix, it competed in that race, and for the rest of the 2018 season, as the Racing Point Force India Formula One Team, continuing to use the constructor's title of Force India.

History

Pre-Racing Point UK
On 27 July 2018, after running Force India Formula One Team for eleven seasons, Force India Formula One Team Limited was placed into administration.

By 2 August 2018 an investment consortium led by Lawrence Stroll, the father of former Williams driver Lance Stroll, and which included André Desmarais, Jonathan Dudman, John D. Idol, John McCaw Jr., Michael de Picciotto and Silas Chou, and supported by the team's senior management personnel, had set up a new company, Racing Point UK Limited, to use as a vehicle to save the team. By 23 August 2018, the new company had reached an agreement with the administrators to buy the team's motor racing assets and to secure the jobs of the 400 employees who worked in the team. The new company created a new constructor with the assets and entered the sport prior to the 2018 Belgian Grand Prix, taking the vacated entry of the original Force India team.

The personnel roles remained largely unchanged in the new team, other than that of Robert Fernley, who stood down from his Force India role of deputy team principal, and Otmar Szafnauer who became team principal and CEO after being chief operating officer with Force India since 2010.

Racing Point Force India F1 Team (2018)

On 23 August 2018, the F1 governing body, the Fédération Internationale de l'Automobile (FIA) reached an agreement with Racing Point UK that they could take over the Force India 2018 season championship entry, but they would not inherit any of Force India's 59 points or the prize money that they had accrued so far in the season. So, as the Racing Point Force India Formula One Team and using the constructor name Force India, the team entered its first Grand Prix, the 2018 Belgian Grand Prix which took place on 26 August 2018, with zero points.

The original Force India's two drivers, Sergio Pérez and Esteban Ocon, remained with the team and were able to continue their challenge for the drivers' championship, keeping all the points that they had already won in the season.

The Racing Point Force India Formula One Team competed in the last nine Grands Prix of the season, amassing 52 points, and finishing seventh overall in the 2018 constructors' championship.

Racing Point F1 Team (2019–2020)

In November 2018, the company changed the name of its team to Racing Point F1 Team and the constructor name to Racing Point when it registered its 2019 entries with the FIA. SportPesa became the team's title sponsor, and Esteban Ocon was replaced by Lance Stroll in the team's driver lineup. In 2020, BWT became the new title sponsor of the team. At the 2020 Sakhir Grand Prix, Pérez gave Racing Point their first win as a constructor and as a legal entity while Stroll also finished on the podium with his 3rd-place finish. This was the first time any incarnation of the team had won a race since Jordan won the 2003 Brazilian Grand Prix. It was the fifth Grand Prix victory for any incarnation of the team.

Aston Martin F1 Team (2021–)

Racing Point UK was renamed AMR GP and entered into the 2021 F1 season through its operation of Aston Martin's Formula One team with Sebastian Vettel and Lance Stroll as their drivers. Vettel replaced Sergio Pérez in the team's driver lineup. As part of the rebrand, the team switched their racing colour of BWT pink to a modern iteration of Aston Martin's British racing green. The Aston Martin AMR21 was unveiled in March 2021 and became Aston Martin's first Formula One car after a 61-year absence from the sport. Vettel earned Aston Martin's first podium by finishing second in the 2021 Azerbaijan Grand Prix.

In January 2022, Team Principal Otmar Szafnauer left after having spent 12 years with the team. Mike Krack, who had previously worked on BMW and Porsche motorsport teams, was announced as his replacement in the same month. Vettel retired following the conclusion of the 2022 season. AMR GP commissioned a new  factory for the team at their Silverstone base. The factory features three interconnected buildings and is based in a 40-acre site directly opposite the Silverstone circuit. It is set to be operational by 2023. Cognizant and Aramco are the team's title sponsors. By March 2023, the number of staff had grown from 400 to 800.

Results

Formula One

* Season still in progress.

References

2018 establishments in the United Kingdom
Companies based in Northamptonshire